Saxparty 6 is a 1979 Ingmar Nordströms studio album. In 1991, it was re-released on CD.

Track listing
Moonlight Serenade
One Way Ticket
Why
Music Box Dancer
But I Do
Morgen
Darlin'
Don Juan
Ballade pour Adeline
Born to Be Alive
Chiquitita
Copacabana
Harbour Lights
Linda
Gamla låtar (The Old Spinning Wheel)

Charts

References 

1979 albums
Ingmar Nordströms albums